Tärnaby is a locality situated in Storuman Municipality, Lappland, Västerbotten County, Sweden with 482 inhabitants in 2010.

It is known for its successful skiers, particularly in the "technical" disciplines: Slalom and Giant Slalom: Ingemar Stenmark, Anja Pärson, Bengt Fjällberg, Stig Strand and Jens Byggmark. In winter Tärnaby is transformed into one of northern Sweden's ski resorts. By summer the Laponian lakes and mountains provide opportunities for activities such as fishing, canoeing, hiking and mountain biking.

18 km further north in the Parish of Tärnaby is the village Hemavan, a ski resort, with an airport and start point of the Kungsleden trail.

See also
 Blue Highway, an international tourist route (Norway - Sweden - Finland - Russia)

References

External links
Tärnaby

Populated places in Västerbotten County
Populated places in Storuman Municipality
Ski areas and resorts in Sweden